The Soil is a South African a cappella group from Soweto founded in 2003, consisting  of the lead singer Ntsika Ngxanga, beatboxer Luphindo, and vocalist  Buhlebendalo Mda.

The band eponymous debut LP The Soil (2011), which  became certified platinum by the Recording Industry of South Africa (RiSA).

History

2003-2010: Formation
Its inception came about in 2003 when all the members met in  Tikelo Secondary School during jam sessions. Back then the group was known as 'Particles of the Soil' and consisted of more than 4 members. As years passed, some members departed due to other engagements. In 2010, the group was down to four members: Buhlebendalo Mda (vocalist), Ntsika Ngxanga (main composer and vocalist), Luphindo (beatboxer and vocalist) & Samkelo Lelethu Mdolomba, commonly known by his stage name, Samthing Soweto. Mdolomba was involved during the recording process of the group's first album, however, due to contractual disputes and creative differences, Samkelo decided to leave and form the contemporary jazz group The Fridge where he served as the lead vocalist.

2010-2017: The Soil, Reflections: (Live In Joburg) , Nostalgic Moments, Echoes of Kofifi 

In 2011, The Soil released their self-titled debut LP The Soil which achieved platinum status, selling over 50,000 copies. On October 7, 2013, their debut live album Reflections: (Live In Joburg) was released and won Best R&B/Soul/Reggae Album at 2014 South African Music Awards.  Their second album Nostalgic Moments was released digitally on iTunes on 15 September 2014. It was made available for hard copy purchase on 22 September 2014. Nostalgic Moments received positive review from music critics. The album includes guest appearances by  Ladysmith Black Mambazo and  hip hop artist Khuli Chana. At the 14th ceremony of Metro FM Awards, the band won Best Produced Album  (Nostalgic Moments) and Best Duo/Group. In 2015, the band was nominated for Best International Act: Africa at BET Awards 2015.

On October 21, 2016, their third studio album titled Echoes of Kofifi was released in South Africa and met positive review from music critics.  The album was nominated for and South African Music Awards in the Best Engineered Album, Best duo/group of the Year and Best Afro-pop Album category. The band further promoted album with Nostalgic Moments Tour in July 2014 at Emalahleni.

In June 2020, the band made their decision to take an indefinite hiatus to pursue solo projects.

2021-present: Upcoming album, concert tour
In November 2021, the band was reportedly working on an album.

The band embarked on A Decade With The Soil Tour on December 3, the tour included two dates that ran through December 2021.

Members
The Soil currently consists of four members: Buhlebendalo "Soil Sister" Mda, Ntsika "Fana-tastic" Ngxanga, Luphindo "Master P" Ngxanga and Theo "Songstress" Matshoba. Theo joined the group in February 2016 as an occasional replacement for Buhlebendalo Mda. Ntsika and Luphindo are biological brothers. During interviews, The Soil usually refers to God as the first member of the group.

Musical style and influence
The Soil musical style has mainly been described as Jazz, Hip hop, Afro-pop, and Afro-soul.

The band cited Miriam Makeba, Busi Mhlongo, Brenda Fassie, and Simphiwe Dana as their music influence.

Discography
The Soil (2011)
Nostalgic Moments (2014)
Echoes of Kofifi (2016)

Awards and nominations

Metro FM Awards 

!
|-
|rowspan="2"|2015
| rowspan="2"|Nostalgic Moments
| Best Produced Album 
|
|rowspan="2"|
|-
|Best Duo/Group
|

South African Music Awards 

|-
|2014
|Reflections Live In Joburg
|Best RnB, Soul and Reggae
|

References

External links 
 

South African musical groups
Musical groups established in 2003
A cappella musical groups